Sholem Ber Hecht (born 1946) is an American Chabad rabbi. Hecht is the CEO of the National Committee for the Furtherance of Jewish Education (NCFJE).

Family
Hecht was born in 1946, the eldest son of Jacob J. Hecht, a Chabad rabbi who was one of the closest and most trusted officials of the Lubavitcher Rebbe Menachem Mendel Schneerson. His brother is Rabbi Shea Hecht. Hecht grew up in East Flatbush, Brooklyn.

Hecht is married to Channah (née Gutnick), originally from Melbourne, Australia. They have 14 children.

Career
Since the 1970s, Hecht has been the rabbi of the Sephardic Jewish Congregation & Center of Forest Hills, Queens. Hecht also serves as the senior Chabad shaliach in the borough of Queens and is a teacher of science and religion at Beth Rivkah girls seminary in Brooklyn. He was previously the editor in English publications at Sichos, the clearinghouse for all of the English-language titles of the Lubavitch movement, and he served as the personal interpreter at live public addresses for the Lubavitcher Rebbe from 1990 to 1993.

Hecht headed an emergency committee during the 1991 Crown Heights riot.

On March 6, 1994, Hecht spoke at the funeral of sixteen-year-old Ari Halberstam, who was murdered in a shooting on the Brooklyn Bridge. Hecht is a first cousin of Halberstam's mother.

Iran rescue operation
Hecht played a leading role in Operation Exodus, an organized Chabad effort to aid the embattled Jews of Iran. From 1978 to 1980, Operation Exodus brought 1,800 Iranian Jewish children to the United States. In August 1978, Rabbis Hecht and Hertzel Illulian visited Tehran to establish a connection between Chabad and the Iranian Jewish community. In the 2019 book Escape from Iran: The Exodus of Persian Jewry During The Islamic Revolution of 1979, Hecht chronicles the history of Operation Exodus.

References

1946 births
20th-century American rabbis
21st-century American rabbis
American Hasidic rabbis
Orthodox rabbis from New York City
Living people